Flavio Anastasia  (born 30 January 1969) is an Italian cyclist. He was born in Mariano Comense (Lombardia), Italy. In 1993, he was in the team Amore & Vita - Galatron.

He won the silver medal in the Team Time Trial at the 1992 Summer Olympics

References

1969 births
Living people
Italian male cyclists
Olympic silver medalists for Italy
Cyclists at the 1992 Summer Olympics
Medalists at the 1992 Summer Olympics
Olympic cyclists of Italy
Olympic medalists in cycling
Cyclists from the Province of Como
UCI Road World Champions (elite men)
20th-century Italian people